Keter ("crown"), in Kabbalah, is one of the ten Sephirot ("Divine emanations").

Keter may also refer to:
 Keter (name), a name of Kenyan origin
 Keter, a component of Yesod (web framework)
 Keter Plastic, an Israeli plastic manufacturing company
 , a book publisher based in Israel
 Tag (Hebrew writing), a calligraphic ornament also called keter
 Keter, a classification for hard-to-contain anomalies in the fictional SCP Foundation universe

ja:ケテル